Faith is a survival horror video game developed by Airdorf Games for Windows. The game consists of three chapters; the first two were self-published by Airdorf Games in October 2017 and February 2019 respectively, while the third was published by New Blood Interactive in October 2022 as part of Faith: The Unholy Trinity, a compilation of all three chapters with additional features. The game uses retro graphics similar to the graphics of an Apple II or Atari 2600.

Gameplay 
Players control a priest as he first attempts to complete a failed exorcism, then tries to prevent the summoning of a great demon. The player's main weapon is a crucifix, which damages and slows enemies when held aloft. It can also exorcise possessed objects, which typically reveal notes that expand upon the game's plot or provide hints related to puzzles.

The game is styled after 8-bit computer games of the early 1980s, such as the ones found on the Atari 2600 console or Apple II computer. Though most of the game is presented in an isometric, low-framerate display, several rotoscoped cutscenes are used throughout each chapter. Additionally, much of the dialogue is presented through 80s-era synthesized speech, with some voice lines and sound effects taken from "real" electronic voice phenomena (EVPs) and exorcisms processed through those same programs. The music is a combination of original music and pre-existing pieces, such as Ludwig van Beethoven's Moonlight Sonata and Erik Satie's Gnossiennes.

The game's story is inspired by the Satanic panic of the 1980s and 90s, where allegations of physical and sexual abuse in the name of Satan were made against teachers, schools, tabletop role-playing games, toy companies, heavy metal musicians, and television/film companies.

Plot

Chapter I 
On September 21, 1987, Catholic priest John Ward returns to the Martin residence in rural Sterling, Connecticut, to finish the botched exorcism of 17-year-old Amy Martin. Exactly one year earlier, Amy killed her parents and John's superior, Father Allred, during the exorcism ritual, and John was traumatized by the event. Amy was incarcerated at Yale Psychiatric Institute for the murders, but she escaped nine days before John's return. While approaching the house through the surrounding woods, he is stalked by a pale humanoid monster that he repels with his cross.

Entering the house, John finds Amy in the attic. He fails to finish the exorcism, and Amy throws herself out a window and flees into the woods. John then finds a gun with a single bullet and a message, written backwards in blood: "KILL HER" (Amy).

Shooting any of five specific targets with the gun concludes the chapter and results in a different ending. Killing Amy causes John to be arrested for murder and accused of impersonating a priest. Shooting at a shadowy figure near a shed ends with John being ambushed by the pale monster. Shooting a deer causes John to be killed by other deer. Shooting a fox corpse left at an apparent ritual site ends with John being captured and possibly sacrificed by cultists. Lastly, returning to John's car (which is characterized in subsequent chapters as John fleeing the house in terror and leaving Amy to die from her injuries) causes the pale monster to emerge, allowing it to be shot and then run over by a passing truck; the monster's remains baffle authorities and are reported as a chupacabra, and John comments that he does not know how to explain what happened at the Martin house, but he must have faith that he did the right thing.

Chapter II 

The chapter begins with another priest, Father Garcia, attempting to perform an exorcism on a teenager he is holding captive named Michael Davies, who is revealed to be the pale monster from Chapter I. Michael was possessed after his stepmother took him to meet her friends, who are implied to be cultists. He breaks free from his restraints before Garcia can complete the exorcism, and escapes after killing and partially eating a passerby.

The player then takes control of John Ward, weeks after the fifth ending of Chapter I. John is suffering a crisis of faith due to the events at the Martin house, but he has nonetheless traveled to Gallup Cemetery in Connecticut to investigate strange activity. He is chased across the cemetery and beyond by demonic creatures, including Amy Martin, who afflict him with terrifying visions and tortures, before eventually finding a hidden cultist sanctuary in the sewers. After he enters the inner sanctum and is attacked by a cloaked old woman, Father Garcia appears and asks for John's help to defeat her. Following a demonic onslaught (where Father Garcia may die if not protected), the woman transforms into a horrifying demon. John then awakens in his bed, revealing that his recent adventure was all a dream. He reads a letter from Father Garcia, asking him to help stop the imminent summoning of a powerful demon.

Chapter III 
The third chapter takes place between October 28 and midnight on Halloween, October 31.

On October 28, John receives a letter from Father Garcia asking him to search the abortion clinic where Amy Martin once worked as a volunteer, and where her possession began. He finds it abandoned, but makes his way inside; while there, he is attacked by a mangled humanoid creature, knocked unconscious, and strapped to a medical table. John escapes the creature and is freed by a police officer who was near the building. As they attempt to leave, the creature attacks again, and the two work together to kill it using John's cross and the officer's gun. John may leave at this point, or he can return to the clinic's basement and solve a puzzle to fight a secret boss in the form of the demonic Mother and her children; doing so reveals the clinic's connection to a man named Gary and his cult, who were responsible for Amy's possession and wish to summon a demon named Malphas in an event known as the Profane Sabbath.

On October 29, John goes to an apartment building in New Haven to assist a woman named Lisa, a childhood friend who had been sending him letters asking for help. He finds the apartment building empty, but soon learns that it is a base of operations for the cult and a possible summoning site for Malphas. After undoing a magical seal preventing him from entering Lisa's room, he finds that she has been possessed by a demon named Alu. John fights and banishes Alu, though Lisa can die in the process; if she does not, she informs John that Gary Miller is the leader of the cult and asks John to stop him. If the player fulfills certain conditions, they will unlock a second secret boss named Tiffany, also known as the Daughter. She was a member of the cult who renounced Gary's rule and attempted to become a demonic vessel on her own, but was rejected. They will also unlock a secret floor of the apartment building, revealing that a cult member has been building a copy of their dead son using bodies collected for Gary.

On October 30, Father Garcia asks John to investigate a nearby daycare center where children have been acting strangely, believing that it is somehow connected to Gary's Cult. John finds the daycare surrounded by police, but manages to sneak in. The children are gone, but he finds drawings indicating Gary's involvement in their disappearance, and a secret passage beneath the school. The passage leads to an extensive cult stronghold, filled with cultists who have been transformed into demonic creatures. As he explores the stronghold, John is ambushed by Gary and injected with a hallucinogenic substance before awakening deeper in the stronghold. Here, John may summon the third secret boss, the Unholy Spirit, who takes the form of a floating head; John can either avoid it as it stalks him or destroy it. John eventually enters the heart of the stronghold and confronts Gary himself, who reveals that his true goal is to summon the Antichrist. John and Gary fight, with John emerging victorious. Father Garcia arrives with a shotgun and forces Gary to retreat. John and Garcia pursue him, finding the entrance to the Crucible, the source of the cult's power, and a broken holy seal.

Endings 
If the player did not defeat all three secret Unholy Trinity bosses (the Mother, the Daughter, and the Unholy Spirit), John and Garcia find the Crucible sealed. John empowers the seal, sealing Gary and the demons inside the Crucible. Father Garcia asks John to join him as an apprentice so that he may train him to fight Gary when he inevitably returns. This ending has two variants based on John's performance. If John saved Lisa and/or tried to help Father Allred in his nightmares, John willingly accepts Garcia's offer; if John failed to save Lisa and abandoned Father Allred, John tries to decline out of cowardice, but Garcia forces him to come along at gunpoint.

If the player defeated the Unholy Trinity, the seal protecting the Crucible is removed. John enters it and finds Gary, now horrifically deformed, in front of a human skeleton. He explains that the skeleton is his mother, who attempted to complete the Profane Sabbath, but failed. Gary attacks John once again, this time fusing with another demon (implied to be Malphas) and his mother's body to form a powerful monster. John defeats this demon using his crucifix and burns the mother's body. Amy Martin appears, and Gary receives her reverently, as she is the intended vessel for the Profane Sabbath. However, the demon possessing Amy calls him a failure and drags him into Hell. John apologizes to Amy for not being able to save her; she forgives him, and asks him to complete the exorcism, putting her soul to rest. John leaves the daycare center, finding the rest of the cult to have died in a shootout with the police. He may choose to learn the art of demon hunting with Father Garcia, or leave town with Lisa (if she survived) and attempt to live a normal life.

A third ending is possible if John returns home each night before completing that night's events. If he does so, the Profane Sabbath occurs without hindrance, and he is ambushed by the cultists and Amy. He finds himself back in the Martin household, now decrepit, before finding a ritual circle and kneeling in it; Amy and Michael Davies appear and hold him in place while a giant hand drags him away. The house is shown to have disappeared, and the screen goes black, showing the words "damnatio memoriae".

Release 
The first chapter was released on itch.io on October 4, 2017. The second chapter was released on February 22, 2019. In November 2019, developer Airdorf Games and publisher New Blood Interactive announced Faith: The Unholy Trinity, a compilation of the first two chapters alongside the newest release, the third and final chapter. At the same time, the first chapter was released on Steam as a demo for The Unholy Trinity. The Unholy Trinity was released for Windows via itch.io and Steam on October 21, 2022, and includes new features such as alternate screen filters and a "turbo" mode which increases the game speed. Console versions were mentioned alongside Windows in the announcement for The Unholy Trinity, with work for a Nintendo Switch version beginning in February of 2023. </ref></ref>

Reception 
Reception for Faith has been positive. Rock Paper Shotguns Noa Smith called the game "one of those little treasures you stumble across on your monthly horror binge." A journalist for the San Francisco Chronicle's Datebook praised the use of retro graphics, writing that "The sudden acceleration into full motion from jerky two-frame animation is jarring enough for a jump scare but still empty enough that players are forced to ask what it is that is attacking them." It was included in IGNs 18 Best Horror Games of 2017.

References 

2017 video games
2019 video games
2022 video games
2010s horror video games
Retro-style video games
Single-player video games
Indie video games
Video games about cults
Video games about demons
Video games about exorcism
Video games developed in the United States
Video games set in 1987
Video games set in Connecticut
Windows games
New Blood Interactive games